Gavin Morgan (born July 9, 1976) is a former Canadian professional ice hockey forward. He played six games in the National Hockey League for the Dallas Stars, however most notably played over 500 games in the American Hockey League. In 2010, he became an assistant coach for the Alabama–Huntsville Chargers men's ice hockey team for a season.

Playing career
As a youth, Morgan played in the 1990 Quebec International Pee-Wee Hockey Tournament with the Toronto Marlboros minor ice hockey team.

Morgan started his career with the junior hockey team Wexford Raiders in 1992. He graduated from the University of Denver, where he played four seasons with the Denver Pioneers, in 1999.

Morgan made his professional début in the 1999–2000, when he split his season between the IHL's Utah Grizzlies, Long Beach Ice Dogs and WCHL's Idaho Steelheads, before earning a regular roster spot with Utah in 2000–01.

He went on to play three seasons with Utah before joining the AHL's Hershey Bears in 2003–04. Even though he spent the majority of the season in Hershey, Morgan went on to make his NHL début with the Dallas Stars during the season. He got 21 penalty minutes during his six games in the NHL.

In the summer of 2004 Morgan was acquired by the Montreal Canadiens, but was immediately sent to the AHL and the Hamilton Bulldogs. He played one season for the Bulldogs, before moving to Switzerland and Basel. He went back to the AHL, playing for the Peoria Rivermen and the Rockford IceHogs, in between a short spell at Austrian team Vienna Capitals. In 2008, Morgan joined Norwegian team Vålerenga.

Coaching career
On August 27, 2010, Morgan was named an assistant coach at the University of Alabama in Huntsville.

References

External links
 Official biography, Alabama–Huntsville Chargers

1976 births
Living people
Alabama–Huntsville Chargers men's ice hockey coaches
Canadian expatriate ice hockey players in Austria
Canadian expatriate ice hockey players in Norway
Canadian expatriate ice hockey players in Switzerland
Canadian expatriate ice hockey players in the United States
Canadian ice hockey centres
Dallas Stars players
Denver Pioneers men's ice hockey players
EHC Basel players
Hershey Bears players
Idaho Steelheads (WCHL) players
Long Beach Ice Dogs (IHL) players
Peoria Rivermen (AHL) players
Reading Royals players
Rockford IceHogs (AHL) players
San Antonio Rampage players
Sportspeople from Scarborough, Toronto
Ice hockey people from Toronto
Undrafted National Hockey League players
Utah Grizzlies (IHL) players
Utah Grizzlies (AHL) players
Vålerenga Ishockey players
Vienna Capitals players